Moments in Time is the debut album by Alex & Nilusha. The album includes pianists Joe Chindamo and Tony Gould, flautist Dave Valentin, trumpeter Miroslav Bukovsky, guitarist Leonard Grygorian, bassist Craig Newman, drummer David Jones, and sarodist Saby Bhattacharya.

Track listing

References

Alex & Nilusha albums
2012 debut albums